Holiday for a Dog (Czech: Prázdniny pro psa) is a Czech comedy film. It was released in 1980.

External links
 

1980 films
Czechoslovak comedy films
1980 comedy films
Czech comedy films
1980s Czech films